Proutiella simplex is a moth of the family Notodontidae. It is only known from the lower Amazon in Brazil.

The length of the forewings is 14–15 mm.

External links
Species page at Tree of Life project

Notodontidae of South America
Moths described in 1856